Sogndalsfjøra is a village in the municipality of Sogndal in Vestland county, Norway. It is located where the river Sogndalselvi runs out in the Sogndalsfjorden, a branch of the large Sognefjorden. The village sits at the intersection of Norwegian National Road 5 and Norwegian County Road 55.

Sogndalsfjøra is home to the association football team Sogndal Fotball.  The team is in the Norwegian Premier League, Tippeligaen and plays at the Fosshaugane Campus.  The area is home to major tourism industries, along with sawmills, lumber production, and a slaughterhouse.  The Lerum Konserves, the largest Norwegian producer of juice and jam, is located here. Sogndalsfjøra is also the home of the regional police station for inner Sogn.  Stedje Church is located in the village. The village has also an active academic environment and is home to one of the five campuses of the Western Norway University of Applied Sciences and Western Norway Research Institute. 

The bridge in the village was replaced in 2018 after the old structure from 1954 showed signs of ageing.

Prior to 2020, the village was the administrative center of the municipality of Sogndal.

References

External links

Villages in Vestland
Sogndal